Gay Olympics most commonly refers to the Gay Games which  were originally named the Gay Olympics but were forced to choose a different name due to legal action by the International Olympic Committee.

The term is sometimes also used to apply to other sporting events:

 Eurogames, an LGBT multi-sport event in Europe
 World Outgames, a worldwide LGBT sporting event